Gabriella Bábi-Szottfried (née Gabriella Szottfried; born 1966) is a Hungarian politician, member of the National Assembly (MP) for Vác (Pest County II) from 2010 to 2014. She was a member of the Committee on Youth, Social, Family, and Housing Affairs since 14 May 2010 and member of the Committee on Health Affairs since 14 February 2011. She was also mayor of Sződliget between 2006 and 2010.

Personal life
Bábi-Szottfried has two daughters, Zsófia and Anna and a son, Levente.

References

1966 births
Living people
Fidesz politicians
Members of the National Assembly of Hungary (2010–2014)
Women members of the National Assembly of Hungary
Mayors of places in Hungary
People from Vác
21st-century Hungarian women politicians